Children in Need 2018 was a campaign held in the United Kingdom to raise money for the charity Children in Need. It was the 39th Children in Need appeal show which was broadcast live on BBC One on the evening of Friday 16 November until the early hours of Saturday 17 November.

Telethon
The culmination of Children in Need 2018 was broadcast on BBC One on 16 November from the BBC Elstree Centre.

Presenters

The presenters were:

Music

Features
 Call the Midwife Christmas special 2018 first look exclusiveCast of EastEnders does Disney Boyzone does Strictly Come Dancing''
 Doctor Who Series 11 (2018) Episode 7 Preview

Totals
The following are totals with the times they were announced on the televised show.

See also
 Children In Need

References

External links
 

2018 in British television
2018 in the United Kingdom
2018
November 2018 events in the United Kingdom